|}

This is a list of the results of the 1917 state election in Western Australia, listed by electoral district.

Results by electoral district

Albany

Avon

 Harrison's designation at the 1914 election was simply "Country", rather than "National Country".

Beverley

Boulder

 Collier won Boulder unopposed at the 1914 election.

Brownhill-Ivanhoe

Bunbury

Canning

Claremont

Collie

Coolgardie

 The previous Labor candidate, Charles McDowall, had been elected unopposed in 1914.

Cue

East Perth

Forrest

Fremantle

Gascoyne

 Gilchrist's designation at the 1914 election was simply "Liberal", rather than "National Liberal".

Geraldton

Greenough

Guildford

Hannans

Irwin

Kalgoorlie

Kanowna

Katanning

Kimberley

Leederville

 Veryard's designation at the 1914 election was simply "Liberal", rather than "National Liberal".

Menzies

 Mullany had run for Labor at the 1914 election.

Moore

Mount Leonora

 Foley had run for Labor at the 1914 election, and was elected unopposed.

Mount Magnet

Mount Margaret

 Taylor had been elected unopposed at the 1914 election.

Murchison

Murray-Wellington

Nelson

 Willmott's designation at the 1914 election was simply "Country", rather than "National Country".

Northam

North-East Fremantle

North Perth

 Smith's designation at the 1914 election was simply "Liberal", rather than "National Liberal".

Perth

Pilbara

Pingelly

Roebourne

South Fremantle

Subiaco

Sussex

Swan

 Nairn's designation at the 1914 election was simply "Liberal", rather than "National Liberal".

Toodyay

 Piesse's designation at the 1914 election was simply "Country", rather than "National Country".

Wagin

West Perth

Williams-Narrogin

Yilgarn

York

See also
 Members of the Western Australian Legislative Assembly, 1914–1917
 Members of the Western Australian Legislative Assembly, 1917–1921

References
 

Results of Western Australian elections
1917 elections in Australia